The 2013 FIBA Africa Championship for Women was the 21st FIBA Africa Championship for Women, played under the rules of FIBA, the world governing body for basketball, and the FIBA Africa thereof. The tournament was hosted by Mozambique from September 20 to 29, with games played at the Pavilhão do Maxaquene in Maputo.

Qualification

Squads

Draw

Preliminary round
Times given below are local UTC+2.

Group A

|}

Group B

|}

Knockout stage

Championship bracket

5th place bracket

9th place bracket

Quarterfinals

9–12 place semifinals

5–8th place semifinals

Semifinals

Eleventh place match

Ninth place match

Seventh place match

Fifth place match

Bronze medal match

Final

Final standings

Angola rosterAstrida Vicente, Catarina Camufal, Clarisse Mpaka, Felizarda Jorge, Fineza Eusébio, Luísa Tomás, Madalena Felix, Nacissela Maurício, Nadir Manuel, Ngiendula Filipe, Sónia Guadalupe, Whitney Miguel, Coach: Aníbal Moreira

Awards

All-Tournament Team
  Deolinda Ngulela
  Ramses Lonlack
  Nacissela Maurício
  Leia Dongue
  Astou Traoré

Statistical Leaders

Individual Tournament Highs

Points

Rebounds

Assists

Steals

Blocks

Turnovers

2-point field goal percentage

3-point field goal percentage

Free throw percentage

Individual Game Highs

Team Tournament Highs

Points per Game

Rebounds

Assists

Steals

Blocks

Turnovers

2-point field goal percentage

3-point field goal percentage

Free throw percentage

Team Game highs

See also
 2013 FIBA Africa Women's Clubs Champions Cup

References

External links
Official Website

2013
2013 in women's basketball
2013 in Mozambique
2013 in African basketball
International women's basketball competitions hosted by Mozambique